Abdolnaser Hemmati (born 9 April 1956) is an Iranian academic, politician and economist who served as the Governor of the Central Bank of Iran from 2018 to 2021. He was previously vice president of the Islamic Republic of Iran Broadcasting (1989–1994), and governor of the Central Insurance of Iran (1994–2006; 2016–2018). He ran as a candidate in the 2021 Iranian presidential election, being the sole representative from the moderate wing of Iranian politicians, and was placed third overall in the results.

References

External links
 Official Website
 
 
 

Living people
1956 births
Iranian bankers
Iranian economists
Iranian broadcasters
Iranian chief executives
Governors of the Central Bank of Iran
Executives of Construction Party politicians
Ambassadors of Iran to China
University of Tehran alumni